National Youth Day, also known as Vivekananda Jayanti, is celebrated on 12 January, being the birthday of Swami Vivekananda. In 1984, the Government of India declared this day as National Youth Day and since 1985 the event is celebrated in India every year.

History 
It was a decision of the Government of India taken in 1984 to celebrate the birthday of great Swami Vivekananda, i.e. 12 January, as National Youth Day every year. The Government of India quoted that 'the philosophy of Swamiji and the ideals for which he lived and worked could be a great source of inspiration for the Indian Youth Day.

Celebration and activities 

The National Youth Day is observed all over India at schools and colleges, with processions, speeches, music, youth conventions, seminars, Yogasanas, presentations, competitions in essay-writing, recitations and sports on 12 January every year. Swami Vivekananda's lectures and writings, deriving their inspiration from Indian spiritual tradition and the broad outlook of his Master Sri Ramakrishna Paramahansa. These were the source of inspiration and have motivated numerous youth organizations, study circles and service projects involving the youth.

Swami Vivekananda's birthday (12 January 1863), according to the Indian Almanac (Vishuddha Siddhanta Almanac) is on Pausha Krishna Saptami tithi, which falls on different dates in the English Calendar every year (generally in the month of January). This is observed in various centres of Ramakrishna Math and Mission in a traditional Hindu manner which includes mangal arati (a kind of worship practised in India, especially by Hindu people), special worship, homa (fire-ritual), meditation, devotional songs, religious discourses and sandhya-arati (vesper service at evenings).

References

External links

Festivals in India
January observances
Observances in India
Memorials to Swami Vivekananda
Birthdays
Youth in India
Annual events in India
Youth events
1985 establishments in India
Recurring events established in 1985